Goin' Up is an album by trumpeter Freddie Hubbard released on the Blue Note label in 1961. It features performances by Hubbard, Hank Mobley, McCoy Tyner, Paul Chambers and Philly Joe Jones. 

Scott Yanow of AllMusic praised Hubbard's "outstanding solos."

Track listing
 "Asiatic Raes" [also known as "Lotus Blossom"] (Kenny Dorham) - 6:46
 "The Changing Scene" (Mobley) - 5:49
 "Karioka" (Dorham) - 6:15
 "A Peck a Sec" (Mobley) - 5:49
 "I Wished I Knew" (Bill Smith) - 7:48
 "Blues for Brenda" (Hubbard) - 6:59

Personnel
Freddie Hubbard - trumpet
Hank Mobley - tenor saxophone
McCoy Tyner - piano
Paul Chambers - bass
Philly Joe Jones - drums

References

1961 albums
Freddie Hubbard albums
Blue Note Records albums
Albums produced by Alfred Lion
Albums recorded at Van Gelder Studio